George Anthony Canale (born August 11, 1965) is a retired Major League Baseball first baseman. He played Major League Baseball for three seasons with the Milwaukee Brewers.

George Canale graduated from Cave Spring High School (Roanoke, Virginia) in 1983 and attended Virginia Tech. from 1984 to 1986.  George hit 76 home runs during his collegiate career, currently 1st all-time at Virginia Tech and 7th all-time in Division I NCAA baseball.   During the 1986 season, George Canale hit the most home runs in Division I baseball with 29 home runs.  The same year, George was chosen as an All-American first baseman on the 1986 College Baseball All-America Team.  His accomplishment led to his induction to the Virginia Tech Sports Hall of Fame.

George was drafted by the Brewers in the 6th round of the 1986 amateur draft. Canale played his first professional season with their rookie league Helena Gold Sox in 1986, and his last with the Pittsburgh Pirates' Triple-A Nashville Sounds in 1998.

See also
1986 College Baseball All-America Team

References

External links
"George Canale Statistics". The Baseball Cube. 23 January 2008.
"George Canale Statistics". Baseball-Reference. 23 January 2008.
Career statistics and player information from Korea Baseball Organization

1965 births
Living people
All-American college baseball players
American expatriate baseball players in South Korea
Baseball players from Memphis, Tennessee
Canton-Akron Indians players
Charlotte Knights players
Colorado Springs Sky Sox players
Helena Gold Sox players
Hyundai Unicorns players
KBO League infielders
Milwaukee Brewers players
Major League Baseball first basemen
Nashville Sounds players
Virginia Tech Hokies baseball players
American expatriate baseball players in Taiwan
American expatriate baseball players in Italy
Carolina Mudcats players
Denver Zephyrs players
El Paso Diablos players
Leones de Yucatán players
American expatriate baseball players in Mexico
Memphis Chicks players
Stockton Ports players
Wei Chuan Dragons players